Return of Halleluja (also known as The West Is Very Close, Amigo) is a 1972 Italian Spaghetti Western film directed by Giuliano Carnimeo and starring George Hilton. It is the sequel to They Call Me Hallelujah.

Plot
In tumultuous Mexico in the 1860s the revolutionary General Ramirez hires Hallelujah, an American gunfighter, to retrieve a stolen Aztec statue. The general believes having recovered it will bring indigenous Indians over to his cause. Also going after the statue is a Scottish adventurer, his argumentative female companion, a pair of bickering brothers from a religious community, the army, and assorted bandits.

Cast 

 George Hilton as Alleluja 
 Lincoln Tate as  Archie 
 Agata Flori as  Fleurette 
 Raymond Bussières as  Sam 
 Riccardo Garrone as  Zagaya 
 Michael Hinz as  Von Steffen 
 Aldo Barberito as  Prete 
 Roberto Camardiel as  Gen. Ramirez 
 Lars Bloch as Caino 
 Giovanni Pazzafini as  Abele
 Paolo Gozlino as  Drake 
 Umberto D'Orsi as  Ferguson 
 Renato Baldini as  Ferguson's Henchman 
 Peter Berling as  Schultz  
 Mara Krupp as  Mara 
 Adriana Facchetti as The Austrian

See also 
 List of Italian films of 1972

References

External links

Spaghetti Western films
1972 Western (genre) films
1972 films
Films directed by Giuliano Carnimeo
Films scored by Stelvio Cipriani
Italian sequel films
West German films
1970s Italian films